Nick Jr. is an Arab television channel in the Middle East and North Africa operated by a joint venture between Paramount Networks EMEAA and OSN. The channel is aimed at pre-school children, Similar to the French version of the channel is known as “Nickelodeon Junior”  in promos but still uses the shortened logo used on other feeds. Until 2011, it was the last remaining Nick Jr. to retain the 2D-3D animated pop-up-book-style ident package that was used from 2005 to 2010 internationally.

History

Programming block on Nickelodeon (2008–2011) 
Nick Jr. was first introduced to Arab viewers on 23 July 2008 as a programming block on Nickelodeon. By 2011, it was the only international Nick Jr. worldwide that had not changed its logo from the 2D-3D animated pop-up-book-style ident package to the orange and blue text after the mother company's 2009 rebrand. On 8 September 2011 when Nickelodeon's Arab feed was closed down & all programs (expect for Oobi) were moved to MBC3.

Re-launch & start as full-time channel (2015–present) 
Nick Jr. was re-introduced to the Arab world along with Nickelodeon on 5 January 2015 on the Emirati provider OSN.

Shows 
Some of the shows:

Dora the Explorer
Dora and Friends: Into the City!
Go, Diego, Go!
Baby Shark's Big Show!
Anna & Friends
Bubble Guppies
Paw Patrol
Shimmer and Shine
Tickety Toc
Pepee
Nella the Princess Knight
Blaze and the Monster Machines
Blue's Clues & You!
Ni Hao, Kai-Lan
Peppa Pig
Deer Squad
Top Wing
Oobi
Abby Hatcher
Butterbean's Cafe
Wonder Pets!
Little Charmers
Rusty Rivets

See also 
 Nickelodeon (Middle Eastern and North African TV channel)
 Nicktoons (Middle Eastern and North African TV channel)

References 

Arabic-language television stations
Children's television networks
MENA
Television channels and stations established in 2015
Television stations in the United Arab Emirates
Television stations in Saudi Arabia
Television stations in Egypt
Television stations in Morocco
Television channels in Jordan
Television stations in the State of Palestine
Television stations in Iraq
Television stations in Algeria
Television stations in Libya
Television stations in Lebanon
Television stations in Kuwait
Television stations in Yemen
Television channels in Syria
Television channels in Mauritania